Robin Bromby (born: 1942) is a New Zealand born Australian journalist and author.

Biography 

He was born in 1942 in Invercargill, New Zealand.

Career 

He has served as the editor-in-chief of the Rails (magazine).

He has also served as the editor of the Salient (magazine).

Bibliography 

His books include:

 Australian Railways, Their Life and Times
 Railways: Their Life and Times: Facts, Figures and Curiosities about Trains from Steam to High Speed
 German Raiders of the South Seas
 New Zealand Railways: Their Life and Times
 A Century of Ashes: An Anthology
 The Farming of Australia: A Saga of Backbreaking Toil and Tenacity
 Newspapers: A Century of Decline: How the Internet was the Last Straw for Print News

References

External links 
 Biography
 Bibliography

Australian writers
New Zealand writers
1942 births
Living people